EQ3 may refer to:

 EQ3, a furniture brand from Palliser Furniture
 EQ3, a predictive text input method 
 Sky-Watcher EQ3, a telescope equatorial mount
 Chery eQ3, an electric car version of the Chery QQ3

See also

 EQ (disambiguation)
 Q3 (disambiguation)
 E3 (disambiguation)
 3 (disambiguation)